Moving Pictures is a television series devoted to film that aired on BBC 2 from 1991 to 1996. It was presented by Rock Follies screenwriter Howard Schuman.

Each program was composed of several short films on different cinematic subjects and not necessarily on current releases. Although it never achieved high ratings, Moving Pictures was frequently used to teach film studies. Interviewed on the set of Pulp Fiction, Quentin Tarantino told John Travolta it was the best show about movies on television. Director Mike Figgis credited a film about himself with salvaging his career after it showed the other side of the story of the making of his film Mr. Jones.

The series finished in 1996, largely due to the huge cost of paying for film clips, but excerpts from it have since appeared as supplementary material on DVD releases. The Criterion Collection editions of Chungking Express and Straw Dogs include Moving Pictures documentaries on Wong Kar-Wai and Sam Peckinpah respectively.

BBC Television shows
1991 British television series debuts
1996 British television series endings
English-language television shows